Hieflau is a former municipality in the district of Leoben in Styria, Austria. Since the 2015 Styria municipal structural reform, it is part of the municipality Landl, in the Liezen District.

References

Ennstal Alps
Cities and towns in Leoben District